Hristo Ivanov may refer to:

 Hristo Ivanov (politician), leader of Yes, Bulgaria!
 Hristo Ivanov (footballer), a Bulgarian footballer